A Way Forward is the second studio album by American synth-pop band, Nation of Language. The album was released on November 5, 2021.

Background 
The album was announced on June 3, 2021, with the release of the first single "Across That Fine Line". Three variations of the vinyl record were made available: a standard black color, a red and blue blend sold from Rough Trade Records, and a coke-bottle-clear color sold through the band's webstore. Rough Trade also offered a bonus CD which features alternate versions of the tracks "A Word & A Wave", "In Manhattan" and "Miranda", plus a remix of the band's 2020 single "A Different Kind of Life" by producer Nick Millhiser.

Reception
The album received a Metascore of 76/100, which indicates generally favorable reviews.

Austin Brown of Pitchfork said, "The band’s decision to expand their swagger and invest in more complex synth work pushes them to new territory, and the most remarkable digressions from their comfort zone point towards a future beyond pastiche." Similarly, Allmusic's Marcy Donelson writes how, "the detailing and variable arrangements here, combined with engaging songs, lift A Way Forward above the level of genre exercise, occasionally into something more compositional".

Track listing 

Tracks 1, 4, 7, 9 and 10 were produced and mixed by Nick Millhiser.
Tracks 2, 3, 5, 6 and 8 were produced and mixed by Abe Seiferth.

Charts

References

External links 

2021 albums
Nation of Language albums
PIAS Recordings albums